Brighter: A Duncan Sheik Collection is a compilation album from American singer-songwriter Duncan Sheik, released through Rhino Records. The album is a repackage of the first disc of Brighter/Later: A Duncan Sheik Anthology, which was released in 2006.

Track listing
"That Says It All" - 4:15
"Court & Spark" - 3:02**
"Lost On The Moon" - 5:09
"Wishful Thinking" - 4:25
"Genius" - 3:42
"Bite Your Tongue" - 3:58
"She Runs Away" - 3:43
"Rubbed Out" - 5:10
"Mr. Chess" - 2:38
"Half-Life" - 3:58
"The Winds That Blow" - 3:03
"In Between" - 4:32
"Mouth On Fire" - 5:39
"Barely Breathing" - 4:15
"Home" (Live @ World Cafe) - 6:45
"On A High" - 3:36
**Previously unissued

Duncan Sheik albums
2007 greatest hits albums
Rhino Records compilation albums